My Xperience is a reggae album by Jamaican dancehall performer Bounty Killer, released in 1996 (see 1996 in music).  Bounty Killer was one of dancehall's biggest stars in the 1990s and his harsh hip hop-influenced songs made him a controversial figure.  Most of the songs on My Xperience are morose tales of poverty and violence.

The album was listed in the 1999 book The Rough Guide: Reggae: 100 Essential CDs.

Reception
The AllMusic review by Alex Henderson awarded the album 4.5 stars stating "Those who aren't big dancehall fans may find the hip-hop-influenced CD hard to get into; those who are heavily into it will find a lot to admire on My Xperience, which contains major dancehall hits like "Living Dangerously" and "Virgin Island." A variety of guests join Bounty—everyone from the Fugees on "Hip-Hopera" to reggae singer Barrington Levy on "Living Dangerously" to hardcore rapper Jeru the Damaja on "Suicide or Murder." Granted, dancehall has its limitations and can wear thin , but even so, My Xperience makes for an exhilarating listen".

Track listing

Personnel
Rodney "Bounty Killer" Price – main artist, producer, arranger, engineer, executive producer
Nel Ust Wyclef Jean – featured artist, producer, arranger, engineer, mixing
Lauryn Hill – featured artist, producer, arranger
Prakazrel "Pras" Michel – featured artist
Anthony Malvo – featured artist, producer, arranger
Anthony "Red Rose" Cameron – featured artist, producer, arranger
Delroy "Junior" Reid – featured artist
Trevor "Busta Rhymes" Smith – featured artist
Barrington Levy – featured artist
Corey "Raekwon" Woods – featured artist
Moses "Beenie Man" Davis – featured artist
Dennis Brown – featured artist
Richie Stephens – featured artist, producer
Kendrick "Jeru the Damaja" Davis – featured artist
Lowell "Sly" Dunbar – producer, arranger
Robbie Shakespeare – producer, arranger
Lloyd "King Jammy" James – producer, arranger
Jerry "Wonda" Duplessis – co-producer
Erick Sermon – producer, arranger
Paul "Jah Screw" Love – producer
Robert "RZA" Diggs – producer, arranger, engineer
Bobby Konders – producer, arranger
Blahzay Blahzay – producer, arranger
Aidan Jones – producer, arranger
John "Johnny Wonder" Scilipoti – executive producer, editing, project coordinator
Warren Riker – engineering, mixing
Selwyn "4th Disciple" Bougard – engineer
Paul "Jazzwad" Yebuah – engineer
David Cole – engineer
Collin "Bulby" York – mixing
Chris Scott – mastering
Paul Shields – mastering
Leroy Champaign – art direction, design
Tim Carter – photography
Backra	 - 	Engineer, Mixing
Computer Paul
The Firehouse Crew
Dean Fraser
Troy Hightower	 - 	Engineer
Lynford "Fatta" Marshall	 - 	Engineer, Mixing
David Sanguinetti	 - 	Project Coordinator
Lloyd "Gitsy" Willis
Kirk	 - 	Engineer, Mixing
Banton	 - 	Engineer, Mixing
Joel Chin	 - 	Compilation, Editing
James Goring	 - 	Project Coordinator
Fat Man	 - 	Engineer, Mixing

Charts

References

External links

1996 albums
VP Records albums
TVT Records albums
Bounty Killer albums
Albums produced by RZA
Albums produced by Erick Sermon
Albums produced by Sly and Robbie